The Honda CB350F is a four-cylinder, four-stroke,  motorcycle based on the larger versions of the day (CB750, CB500). The motorcycle was manufactured by Honda in Japan from 1972 to 1974. At the time, the CB350F was the smallest capacity four cylinder motorcycle ever to enter into full-scale production. There were no changes to the 1973 model, but Honda designated the 1974 bike the CB350F1.   

Soon after production was discontinued, it was replaced by the CB400F. Although Honda had a 350 Twin that critics said was more powerful, lighter, and cheaper, many felt the 350 Four was faster and smoother running.

References

CB350F
Standard motorcycles
Motorcycles introduced in 1974